João Pinto (born 1971) is a Portuguese footballer.

João Pinto may also refer to:

João Pinto (footballer, born 1961), former Portuguese football defender
João Oliveira Pinto (born 1971), former Portuguese football midfielder
João Manuel Pinto (born 1973), former Portuguese football defender
João Paulo (footballer, born 1980), Portuguese football forward
João Luís Pinto, Portuguese rugby union coach
João Teixeira Pinto (1876–1917), Portuguese military officer